Yann Apperry (born 1972) is a French novelist, librettist, screenwriter, and translator. He is a recipient of the Prix Médicis, the Prix Goncourt des lycéens and the Writer's Fellowship of the Fondation Hachette. He is one of the founders of Groupe Ouest and Abalone Productions. He has been performing since 2006 with Claude Barthélemy in the musical duo Bruit Blanc.

Publications

Novels 
1997: Qui Vive, Éditions de Minuit
1999: Paradoxe du ciel nocturne, Éditions Grasset
2000: Diabolus in Musica, Grasset
2003: Farrago, Grasset
2008: Terre sans maître, Grasset

Theatre 
2003: Les Hommes sans aveu, Actes Sud

Youth literature 
2009: L'Île aux histoires, with Tanja Siren,

Theater and musical performances 
2002: Mercure apocryphe, directed by Valérie Crunchant
2002: Je dirai ceci d'obscur, Petit Odéon, Théâtre de l'Odéon
2003: Les Hommes sans aveu, Théâtre du Gymnase (Marseille), Théâtre National de Chaillot
2009: Terra Vagans, Théâtre du Gymnase
2010: Calvino Reloaded, Festival des Correspondances de Manosque, La Dynamo
2012: Mineurs, with pupils of collège Maurice de Vlaminck in Brezolles

Radio 
2002: Les Sentimentales funérailles, France Culture, music by Massimo Nunzi
2008: Bruit Blanc, France Culture, with Claude Barthélémy
2012: La Foire aux chansons, France Culture, music by Régis Huby
2012: Calvinologie, France Culture, music by Massimo Nunzi.

Scripts 
2007: 24 mesures, by Jalil Lespert
2013: YSL, by Jalil Lespert, contribution to the script

Discography 
1999:Vuoti a perdere, bande originale du film, music by Massimo Nunzi
2010: All Around, Abalone-Oenso, music by Régis Huby
2011: Lieder, 3=Tomato, record by Claude Barthélémy

Translations 
2002 : IX variations sur un thème de Balthus, Horacio Amigorena, Absteme & Bobance
2007: Tessons roses, Ornela Vorpsi, Actes Sud
2014: Alex's Baby, Anne de Pasquale, Marabout

Prizes 
1997: Prix Bretagne for Qui vive
1997: Boursier de la Fondation Hachette
2000: Prix Médicis for Diabolus in musica
2002: Grand Prix international de la fiction radiophonique Paul Gilson for Les Sentimentales funérailles
2003: Prix Goncourt des lycéens for Farrago

References

External links 
 Yann Apperry on Babelio
 Yann Apperry : Farrago on INA.fr (19 January 2004)
 Farrago on L'Express (1 November 2003)
 Yann Apperry on France Culture

21st-century French non-fiction writers
21st-century French dramatists and playwrights
Prix Médicis winners
Prix Goncourt des lycéens winners
1972 births
Living people